Mediate may refer to:

"Mediate" (song), by INXS
Domenic Mediate (born 1982), professional soccer player
Rocco Mediate (born 1962), professional golfer
A common misspelling of the website Mediaite

See also
 Mediation (disambiguation)